Narni (in Latin, Narnia) is an ancient hilltown and comune of Umbria, in central Italy, with 19,252 inhabitants (2017). At an altitude of 240 m (787 ft), it overhangs a narrow gorge of the Nera River in the province of Terni. It is very close to the geographic center of Italy. There is a stone on the exact spot with a sign in multiple languages.

History 

The area around Narni was already inhabited in the Paleolithic and Neolithic Ages, as attested by finds in some of the caves. Around the start of the first millennium the Osco-Umbrian, a people with a language of Indo-European origin that dominated the left bank of the Tiber that vertically cuts the region to the Adriatic sea, settled in the area and called the town Nequinum. Records mention Nequinum as early as 600 BC.

The Romans conquered Nequinum in the 4th century BC and made it a position of force in this key point of the Via Flaminia the famous road which connected the city of Rome to the Adriatic Sea (at that time the road passed through the town descending to the right bank of the Nera to then carrying on to Carsulae, Acquasparta, Massa Martana and Spoleto). It supported the Gauls with the hope of freeing itself from Rome. The attempt failed and the victorious Romans changed its name to Narnia after the nearby Nar River; as in the case of Benevento, the former name was considered of ill augury: in Latin, nequeo means "I am unable", and nequitia means "worthlessness".

In 299 BC it became a Roman Municipality, and took the name Narnia. The recent discovery of an ancient Roman shipyard within its territory has made researchers supposing a particular importance during the Punic Wars. In 209 BC, however, Narnia refused to help the Romans financially for their aim to carry on the war against Carthage. During the Roman times it was a strategical outpost for the Roman army.

The Roman Emperor Nerva was born at Narni in 30 AD.

Narnia is mentioned in an Early Christian list of "false gods" in the second century Church father Tertullian's 'Apology', midway into Chapter 21. "Not even a human being would care to have unwilling homage rendered him and so the very Egyptians have been permitted the legal use of their ridiculous superstition, liberty to make gods of birds and beasts, nay, to condemn to death any One who kills a god of their sort. Every province even, and every city, has its god. Syria has Astarte, Arabia has Dusares, the Norici have Belenus, Africa has its Caelestis, Mauritania has its own princes. I have spoken, I think, of Roman provinces, and yet I have not said their gods are Roman for they are not worshipped at Rome any more than others who are ranked as deities over Italy itself by municipal consecration, such as Delventinus of Casinum, Visidianus of Narnia, Ancharia of Asculum, Nortia of Volsinii, Valentia of Ocriculum, Hostia of Satrium, Father Curls of Falisci, in honour of whom, too, Juno got her surname."

In Late Antiquity it suffered the events of the Greek-Gothic war and was plundered by Totila. Narni was contested by the Exarchate of Ravenna and the Lombard Duchy of Spoleto in the late sixth century as the city controlled the southern reaches of the Via Flaminia, an essential route between Rome and Ravenna. Seat of a Lombard gastald, Narnia embraced the cause of Otho I of Saxony thanks to the mediation of its bishop, now Pope John XVII. Narni was part of the possessions of the Countess Matilde, once more part of the Dominions of the Church in 726. In 755 Fulrad went to "Rome carrying the keys of these towns,  which he handed to the Pope [...]: Ravenna, Ariminum, Pisaurum, Conca, Fanus, Caesenae, Senogalliae, Esium, Forum Pompilii, Forum Livii, Narnia and others". During the late 9th to early 10th century, Narni was, along with much of central Italy, a stronghold of, or threatened by the Saracens.

From the 11th century it began to increase in wealth and power, was opposed to Pope Paschal II in 1112 and rose against Barbarossa in 1167. This insubordination cost Narni a ferocious repression imposed by the archbishop Christian of Mainz, Barbarossa's chancellor. In 1242 Narni, prevalently tied to the Guelph party, entered into an alliance with Perugia and Rome against the Empire.

In the following century it was included in the reconquest of the papal patrimony by Cardinal Albornoz, who also had the mighty Rocca built. It was the work of Ugolino di Montemarte, known as il Gattapone. He was also author of the plans for the Loggia dei Priori and the Colonnade that faces out onto the Piazza dei Priori together with the 13th century Palazzo del Podestà and the 14th century fountain.

In 1373 Narni was given as fief to the Orsini to whom it returned in 1409. Occupied by King Ladislaus of Naples, in the 15th century, to be soon again reabsorbed by the church, thanks to Braccio da Montone. July 15, 1527 marked a decisive turning-point in Narni's history. The troops of Charles V, mostly in fact German mercenaries (Landsknechts), put the city to fire and sword; it lost its ancient prosperity. Even the inhabitants of Terni took advantage of the situation to deliver their blame to give vent to their long-repressed hatred of Narni. Its reconstruction gives it a physiognomy characteristic of the cities in Papal territory. It became part of the Roman Republic in 1789. In 1831 it joined the revolt against Gregory XVI and was annexed to the Italian Kingdom in 1860.

Monuments and sites of interest
Like many of the smaller towns of Umbria, Narni is still of strikingly medieval appearance today, with stone buildings, and narrow cobblestone streets.  The town is famous for one of the largest Roman bridges (Ponte d'Augusto) ever built, by which the Via Flaminia crossed the Nera. One arch of the bridge still stands; it is some 30 meters high.

Religious architecture or sites 
Duomo (Narni Cathedral).
Santa Maria Impensole church.
Santa Pudenziana, Romanesque church just outside the town.
Sant'Agostino, church decorated with 18th-century tromp-l'oeil frescoes.
San Cassiano, Benedictine abbey outside of town
San Domenico, 12th-century church
Santa Margherita
San Francesco
Santa Restituta

Secular and civic architecture or sites 
Communal Palace (13th century).
Palazzo dei Priori, located in the ancient Roman forum's site.
Rocca Albornoziana (Albornoz' Castle), overlooking the town, now hosting temporary exhibitions.
 Eroli Museum with a Domenico Ghirlandaio's altarpiece.

Narnia and C. S. Lewis
The imaginary land of Narnia, described in the works of C. S. Lewis, was named after Narni after he came across the name in an atlas as a child.

Concerning Narnia and Narni Roger Lancelyn Green writes about C.S. Lewis and Walter Hooper:

Notable people 
 Marcus Cocceius Nerva – Roman emperor 96–98.
 Erasmo of Narni, best known as "Gattamelata", a famous condottiere. 
 Primo Dorelli (1872–1963), Italian anatomist. 
 Rino Gaetano, singer-songwriter, studied at the Piccola Opera del Sacro Cuore from 1961 to 1967. 
 Cardinal Berardo Eroli
 Blessed Lucy of Narni

See also 
 Roman shipyard of Stifone (Narni)

References

External links 

 Official website
 Eroli Museum
 Underground Narni (Narni Sotterranea)
 Bill Thayer's site

Hilltowns in Umbria
Roman sites of Umbria